Frankfurter Allee is a Berlin U-Bahn station located on the  line.

History
The U-Bahn station was opened on 21 December 1930 and called Frankfurter Allee (Ringbahn). This whole of the section of the U5 line that was opened that day was developed by  Alfred Grenander. On 8 May 1944, it was hit directly into the ceiling.

Originally the station was red, however it was changed to orange in the restoration of the station in the 1980s. After a second restoration in the 2004  the red colour was restored with a new wall tiles. A lift was added between the platform and the level immediately under the street (leaving one flight of stairs to be navigated) and there is direct access from this level to the neighbouring Ring-Centre shopping centre.

References

External links

U5 (Berlin U-Bahn) stations
Buildings and structures in Friedrichshain-Kreuzberg
Railway stations in Germany opened in 1930